King of KingZ is a demo album by German rapper Bushido, released 2001 on tape. In 2003, it was re-released by German label Aggro Berlin and subsequently banned for minors by the Federal Department for Media Harmful to Young Persons in 2005. Following the ban, Bushido's label ersguterjunge released a new edition of the album (without the banned tracks) combined with Demotape under the title King of KingZ - Demotape - Extended Version.

Track listing

Extended version

Samples 
"Mittelfingah" contains a sample of "Mourning Palace" by Dimmu Borgir
"Pitbull" contains a sample of "Gathering of the Storm" by Arcana
"Kalter Krieg" contains a sample of "The Phantom of the Opera" by Andrew Lloyd Webber
"Schlangen" contains a sample of "Sweet Talkin Woman" by ELO
"Allstars" contains a sample of "Thug Muzik" by Mobb Deep
"Ich wurde" contains a sample of  "Promethee" by Akhenaton
"Arschfick (Ersguteremix)" contains a sample of the music in the movie Mean Machine (approx. 9 minutes, 19 seconds into the movie)

References

External links
https://web.archive.org/web/20100603053043/http://zeitzeuge.blog.de/2008/10/06/musik-bushido-klaut-nox-arcana-4830657/

2001 albums
Bushido (rapper) albums
German-language albums